Syarhey Pawlyukovich (born 19 May 1974) is a Belarusian former professional football coach and former player.

Honours
Dinamo Minsk
 Belarusian Premier League champion: 2004

Khazar Lankaran
 Azerbaijan Premier League champion: 2006–07
 Azerbaijan Cup winner: 2006–07

References

External links
 

1974 births
Living people
Association football defenders
Belarusian footballers
Belarusian expatriate footballers
Expatriate footballers in Azerbaijan
Expatriate footballers in Russia
FC Torpedo Minsk players
FC Amkar Perm players
FC Tom Tomsk players
FC Dinamo Minsk players
Khazar Lankaran FK players
Belarusian football managers
FC Arsenal Dzerzhinsk managers